The Candy House is a novel written by Jennifer Egan and published by Scribner's with a U.S. release date of April 5, 2022.

Background and context
This novel is a sequel to Egan's 2010 novel, A Visit From the Goon Squad. Many of the characters from A Visit from the Goon Squad return with an update to their stories, including having had children.

Stories 

 "The Affinity Charm" – Bix, CEO of the social media company Mandala, is longing for a new tech innovation. He overhears that experiments are being done to externalize the memories of animals, which sparks an idea.
 "Case Study: No One Got Hurt" – Alfred is obsessed with authenticity. He screams in public to elicit genuine reactions from strangers, causing strife with his family.
 "A Journey: A Stranger Comes to Town" – Miles considers his life to be a failure, and Drew struggles with guilt over Rob's death. Their lives change when they meet.
 "Rhyme Scheme" – Lincoln works for Mandala as a "counter", someone who analyzes the data from users to predict behavior. He tries to figure out how to get coworker M to fall in love with him.
 "The Mystery of Our Mother" – Melora recounts the family history of her anthropologist mother and absent father Lou.
 "What the Forest Remembers" – Charlene uses Mandala to explore the memories of her father Lou on his trip in the 1960s.
 "Bright Day" – Roxy, a recovering heroin addict, uploads her memories to Mandala and is ready to start a new life.
 "'i,' the Protagonist" – Chris works complacently for a company that "algebraizes" stories to basic tropes. On a frustrating trip with a coworker, he finds new direction in life.
 "The Perimeter: After" – Molly, a teenager, experience tensions with her friends when new girl Lulu arrives.
 "Lulu the Spy, 2032" – Lulu works as a spy for the Citizen Agent program. 
 "The Perimeter: Before" – Hannah, Molly's sister, recounts her mother's feud with their neighbor Jules. 
 "See Below" – A series of intersecting email threads between the large cast of the novel's characters.
 "Eureka Gold" – Gregory, the son of Bix, mourns the death of his father.
 "Middle Son (Area of Detail)" – Ames strikes a surprise home-run in a baseball game. The story quickly recounts events of his future, then returns to the triumphant moment of his home run.

Reception
Dwight Garner of The New York Times writes  Egan has a zonking sense of control; she knows where she’s going and the polyphonic effects she wants to achieve, and she achieves them, as if she were writing on a type of MacBook that won’t exist for another decade. “The Candy House” and “Goon Squad” are touchstone New York City and technology...novels of our time; they’ll be printed in one volume someday, I suspect, by the Library of America.

Kirkus Reviews says As she did in Goon Squad’s PowerPoint chapter, Egan doles out information in small bites that accumulate to demonstrate the novel’s time-honored strengths: richly complicated characters and compelling narratives...[and the novel is a] thrilling, endlessly stimulating work that demands to be read and reread.

The novel has been longlisted for the 2023 Andrew Carnegie Medal for Excellence in Fiction. Publishers Weekly named it one of the top ten works of fiction published in 2022. It was also selected for The New York Timess "10 Best Books of 2022" list.

References

External links

Author website
Book Marks. Collected reviews for "The Candy House." March 30, 2022
Jennifer Egan introduces her new novel, The Candy House. Video. YouTube. March 30,2022.

2022 American novels
Novels set in New York City
Charles Scribner's Sons books
Postmodern novels
Nonlinear narrative novels